Thomas Brodhead House, also known as The Brick House, is a historic home located at Clermont in Columbia County, New York.  The house was built about 1795 and is a two-story, three bay Federal style brick residence with a hipped roof.  Also on the property is a brick smoke house.

It was added to the National Register of Historic Places in 1983.

References

Houses on the National Register of Historic Places in New York (state)
Federal architecture in New York (state)
Houses completed in 1795
U.S. Route 9
Houses in Columbia County, New York
National Register of Historic Places in Columbia County, New York